Amauta is a genus of moths within the family Castniidae. It was described by Constant Vincent Houlbert in 1918.

Species
 Amauta ambatensis (Houlbert, 1917)
 Amauta cacica (Herrich-Schäffer, [1854])
 Amauta hodeei (Oberthür, 1881)
 Amauta papilionaris (Walker, [1865])

References

Castniidae